The Maong River is a river in Sarawak, Malaysia. It is a tributary of the Sarawak River, joining it about half a kilometer from the city center of Kuching.

See also
 List of rivers of Malaysia

References

Rivers of Sarawak
Rivers of Malaysia